The Rigi (or Mount Rigi; also known as Queen of the Mountains) is a mountain massif of the Alps, located in Central Switzerland. The whole massif is almost entirely surrounded by the water of three different bodies of water: Lake Lucerne, Lake Zug and Lake Lauerz. The range is in the Schwyzer Alps, and is split between the cantons of Schwyz and Lucerne, although the main summit, named Rigi Kulm, at 1,798 meters above sea level, lies within the canton of Schwyz. The Rigi Kulm Hotel, established in 1816, is located on the summit.

The Rigi Kulm and other areas, such as the resort of Rigi Kaltbad, are served by Europe's oldest mountain railways, the Rigi Railways. The whole area offers many activities such as skiing or sledging in the winter, and hiking in the summer.

Peaks

Etymology

The name Rigi is from Swiss Old High German *rigî "horizontal stratification, strip, band", from OHG rîhan "gird; pleat, string", cf. OHG rîga "row, stripe, furrow", after the horizontal rock ledges and grass strips surrounding the mountain from west to east.
The name is first recorded in 1350 as Riginun.

The name was interpreted as Regina montium "queen of mountains" by Albrecht von Bonstetten (1479), who however gives Rigena as alternative form.

Bonstetten's interpretation as Regina was influential in the 17th century, and was still repeated in 18th-century travelogues. Karl Zay (Goldau und seine Gegend, 1807) criticized this latinization, arguing for mons rigidus instead. Later in the 19th century, many authors repeated either rigidus or regina as the name's supposed origin. The two possibilities were also adduced as explanation of the name's grammatical gender alternating between masculine and feminine.
Brandstetter (Die Rigi, 1914) finally discredited these interpretations and established the origin in Old High German rîga (whence modern German Reihe, Reigen; cognate with English row).

Transport

There are multiple public transport options available to ascend Mount Rigi:

 By rack railway from Arth-Goldau and Vitznau, operated by the Rigi Bahnen. The Vitznau-Rigi-Bahn started operation on May 21, 1871 and was the first mountain railway in Europe. On June 4, 1875 the Arth-Rigi-Bahn was finished, allowing access from the other side of the mountain. They were electrified in 1937 and 1907 respectively, with the Arth-Rigi-Bahn becoming the first electrified standard gauge rack-railway in the world. Both lines go all the way to the summit, Rigi Kulm.
 By gondola lift from Weggis to Rigi-Kaltbad.
 By cable-car from the Kräbel station on the Arth-Rigi-Bahn line to Rigi-Scheidegg.

Recreation 
There are also numerous public grilling stations located near the hiking trails.

Rigi is also a destination for people practising winter sports and other winter recreation activities.

Rigi in culture 

Rigi has been featured in many works of art, including both paintings and literary publications. Perhaps the most famous paintings of the Rigi were a series by J. M. W. Turner, including The Blue Rigi, Sunrise, several of which are in the collection of the Tate Britain art gallery in London.

Mark Twain also visited Rigi during his tour of Central Europe in the late 1870s, and wrote about his travels in chapter 28 of his A Tramp Abroad.

There is a Catskills resort called the Rigi Kulm in Abraham Cahan's novel The Rise of David Levinsky (1917).

The Rigi, a downhill road in Wellington, New Zealand, is named for the mountain and for many years was used as a main thoroughfare for coach riders.

On 9 July 1868, during a three-week tour through Switzerland, Gerard Manley Hopkins ascended Rigi-Kulm, the highest peak of the Rigi massif: "From Lucerne by steamer to Küssnacht, thence walk across to Immensee, thence by steamer over lake of Zug to Arth, whence up the Rigi."

Geology
Technically, the Rigi is not a part of the Alps, and belongs instead to the Swiss plateau. It is mostly composed of molasse and other conglomerate, as opposed to the Bündner schist and flysch of the Alps.

Gallery

See also
List of mountains of the canton of Schwyz
List of mountains of Switzerland
List of most isolated mountains of Switzerland
List of mountains of Switzerland accessible by public transport

References

External links 

 Rigi on SummitPost
 Various maps from rigi.ch
 Rigi Kulm

Mountains of Switzerland
Mountains of the Alps
Mountains of the canton of Schwyz
Tourist attractions in Switzerland
Cable cars in Switzerland
Tourist attractions in the canton of Lucerne
Tourist attractions in the canton of Schwyz
One-thousanders of Switzerland